Winters Station is an unincorporated community in Sandusky County, in the U.S. state of Ohio.

History
A post office called Winters Station was established in 1861, and remained in operation until 1873. The community was named for Jacob Winter, proprietor.

References

Unincorporated communities in Sandusky County, Ohio
Unincorporated communities in Ohio